Bunchosia armeniaca is a species in the family Malpighiaceae native to northwestern South America (Colombia, Ecuador, Bolivia, Venezuela, Brazil and Perú). Common names include cansaboca, ciruela de fraile, guaimaro, indano and cold-earth mamey.

Bunchosia armeniaca can attain a height of 20 meters, but it commonly grows to 5 meters. It can be found between 100–2600 m of elevation in a wide range of ecological habitats.

Bunchosia armeniaca yields a fruit that is very sweet and with cloying red pulp, which adheres strongly to the seeds, hence the Spanish etymology cansaboca (tired mouth). The two seeds in each berry are poisonous. Due to rapid spoilage on the tree, the fruit are often harvested while still a creamy-green and ripened to a red colour indoors.

References

External links

argentea
Plants described in 1789
Flora of Colombia
Flora of Venezuela
Flora of Brazil
Flora of Ecuador
Flora of Bolivia
Tropical fruit
Trees of Peru
Taxa named by Antonio José Cavanilles